Meadow Mari or Meadow-Eastern Mari or Eastern Mari is a standardised dialect of the Mari language used by about half a million people mostly in the European part of the Russian Federation. Meadow Mari, Hill Mari, and Russian are official languages in the Mari El Autonomous Republic of the Russian Federation.

Alphabet

References

External links

 Meadow & Eastern Mari - Finnish dictionary (robust finite-state, open-source)

Mari language
Languages of Russia